Gemelli are a type of pasta. The name derives from the Italian word for "twins". It is most often used for making casserole or pasta salads.

Gemelli are not twin tubes twisted around one another, as they may appear to be, but rather a single s-shaped strand twisted into a spiral. The strips are glued together to form a single piece of dough, similar to fusilli.

See also
 List of pasta

References

External links
 The Cook's Thesaurus: Pasta Shapes

Types of pasta